The women's 400 metres event at the 1967 Summer Universiade was held at the National Olympic Stadium in Tokyo on 1 September 1967. It was the first time that this distance was contested by women at the Universiade.

Results

References

Athletics at the 1967 Summer Universiade
1967